The Appalousa (also Opelousa) were an indigenous American people who occupied the area around present-day Opelousas, Louisiana, west of the lower Mississippi River, before European contact in the eighteenth century. At various times in their history, they were associated with the neighboring Atakapa and Chitimacha peoples.

The name Opelousa has been thought to have many meanings, but the one most commonly accepted is "Blackleg." The tribe was known for painting or staining their lower legs a dark color.

Michel De Birotte, who lived in Louisiana from 1690 to 1734, about forty years of which he spent living among the Indians, said the Appalousa lived just west of two small lakes. This description is thought to apply to Leonard Swamp (east of present-day Opelousas). During the period, this was the westernmost channel of the Mississippi River. Because of mineral deposits and the great number of leaves covering the bottom, the waters of the lake appeared black. The Appalousa who hunted and fished in the lake found their legs became stained black from these waters.

History 
Opelousa and Atakapa tribes originated in the same region in southwest Louisiana. It is also mentioned that their village had about 40 men, they grew corn and raised cattle and pigs. From American State Papers, a member of the Opelousa and Atakapa region in 1814, said that both tribes had villages on the north and south parts of the bayou.

Referred to as also the Lopelousas and Oqué-Loussas by Du Pratz, a French historian and ethnographer, but it is still debated if these are all the same tribe. Du Pratz said that this tribe resided on lakeshores that had a black appearance due to the leaves that covered the bottoms of the lakes. This connects to one theory of how they received their names “Black leg, black hair, black skull, etc. This also has some debate, other historians and explorers have stated that the people of the tribe would paint their legs black to contrast to their lighter skin.

As settlers pushed into Mississippi further west, the territory that the Opelousas resided in came to be known as the Opelousas district which remains a district in Louisiana today. Name also used for St Landry Parish in Louisiana.

Origin Story 
Atakapa origin story (used for the region including the Opelousa tribe) about two forbidden lovers from different tribes, one a princess and the other a warrior. The princess’ father did not approve and followed them to swamplands where they met and killed the warrior. The princess retaliated by stabbing herself which saddened the great spirit and hung her hair in an oak tree, turning gray and spreading through the trees over time. This story served as an example of the importance of Opelousa territory history. This history also emphasized its profitability and economics that led French traders to establish the city of Opelousas in 1740.

Religion 
There is very little known about the practices and religion of the Opelousa tribe; however, tracing genealogy in St. Landry Parish, Louisiana lists Opelousas Indians that were buried and baptized. This list includes Opelousa Indians as well as Indians from other tribes across Louisiana.

Population 
According to findings from a few historians, the Opelousa population in 1715 was roughly 130 men, and by 1908, there were 9 people in the tribe. There is debate over the population growth of the tribe but what is consistent is their slow decline towards the early 19th century.

First mentioned in an unpublished report by Bienville (former governor of Louisiana), a small wandering tribe, 1715 the population was about 130 men/warriors, 1805 the population was about 40 and 1814 the tribe was at about 20 members.

The first record of the Opelousa territory was found in the 1690s and it wasn't until 1712 that both the Opelousa and Atakapa regions were recorded as settlements in Louisiana.

Language

Dr. John Sibley reported in an 1805 letter to Thomas Jefferson that the Opelousa spoke a language different from all others but many understood Atakapa (itself a language isolate) and French. (This area had been colonized by the French since the mid-eighteenth century.) Their language is completely undocumented.

In the early twentieth century, anthropologists John R. Swanton and Frederick W. Hodge tentatively classified the Opelousa language as Atakapa.

Their languages were linguistically similar, both Opelousa and Atakapa are Choctaw words. Opelousa itself is unclear whether it is a Choctaw word but the translation from choctaw is “black above” “black legs” and other variations. In 1805, Dr. John Sibley, Indian Agent of New Orleans territory, said that the word Appalousa meant “black head” or “black leg” and while similar to Atakapa, their language was unheard of but understood Atakapa as well as French.

Name Origin 
Origin unknown but speculated to be Choctaw, "aba" meaning “above” or "api" meaning “body” or “leg” followed by "lusa," meaning “black.” The meaning of Opelousa changes depending on which Choctaw elements are correct, "aba" and lusa have translations to “black hair” but using "api" and "lusa" translates to “black legs.”

Relations with Other Tribes 
Tribes in Texas used the Opelousa as a middlemen in selling horses stolen from the Spanish to the French in New Orleans. Had relations with the Atakapas, Chitimacha, and Avoyel tribes of the surrounding region and acted as a middleman between them in trade. They received fish from the Chitimacha and Atakapa which was traded with the Avoyel for flint because they had an overabundance of it although it was most likely traded and exchanged with other tribes.

Historians have come together to dismiss the fate of the Opelousas and other tribes of the southwestern region of LA, claiming that the Opelousas and Atakapas no longer exist. These smaller native tribes were struck with disease, malnutrition and colonization which may have contributed to this conclusion. Historians and researchers also pass on theories of intermarriage and interracial relations with the French. However, it is also debated and studied whether these tribes assimilated and grew into the Creole nation and creoles of color communities.

According to Claude Medford, a Choctaw craftsman, around the 1920s, the Opelousas camped at Ringrose plantation, sold palmetto stems and cane split baskets to the owners of the plantation and engaged in games of stickball with the Tunica.

Conflict 
Population decreased due to conflict with whites and the Muskhogean tribe. Only diet known is fish, more specifically flounder, favorite of the region, which they also used in trade for flints. Went to war with the Avoyels (tribe that may have belonged to the larger Muskhogean tribe) because, the latter refused to trade flints that they had an abundance of, some Avoyels were captured and according to some, they were eaten although it is unknown and debated whether acts of cannibalism occurred in the Opelousa or Atakapa tribes.

References

Goddard, Ives. (2005). "The indigenous languages of the Southeast", Anthropological Linguistics, 47 (1), 1–60.

Atakapa
Native American tribes in Louisiana
Unattested languages of North America